Charles H. Boud (October 3, 1843 – September 1, 1921) was an American Democratic Party politician from New Jersey, who served on the Monmouth County, New Jersey Board of Chosen Freeholders and the New Jersey General Assembly.

Biography
Boud was born in the Farmingdale, then a part of Howell Township. He worked as a Stationmaster for the Pennsylvania Railroad and the New Jersey Southern Railroad before working as superintendent of the Freehold and Squankum Marl Company.

In 1879 Boud was elected to the Board of Chosen Freeholders representing Howell Township and served until 1882. At the May 11, 1882 annual reorganization, he was chosen as Director of the Monmouth County, New Jersey Board of Chosen Freeholders, and served as Director for one year before leaving the board.

In 1882 he was Secretary of the Monmouth County Democratic/Republican Executive Committee.

In the 1883 general election, Charles H. Boud was elected to a one-year term in the New Jersey General Assembly.

Boud died on September 1, 1921, and is buried in Farmingdale Evergreen Cemetery in Howell, New Jersey.

See also
List of Monmouth County Freeholder Directors

Notes and references

1843 births
1921 deaths
County commissioners in New Jersey
Democratic Party members of the New Jersey General Assembly
People from Farmingdale, New Jersey
Politicians from Monmouth County, New Jersey